Akasa Air, is an Indian low-cost airline based in Mumbai, India. Akasa Air currently operates a majority of its flights from two of its hubs. The two operating bases are in Bangalore and Mumbai. The airline commenced flights on 7 August 2022, launching flights between Mumbai to Ahmedabad.

, Akasa Air serves a total of 14 destinations with plans to launch 3 more destinations, all being domestically located within India. There have also been plans to launch international flights in the future as well.

List
Akasa Air
Akasa Air

References 

Akasa Air
Akasa Air